The 1969 New Zealand Open (also known as the 1969 Benson & Hedges Open for sponsorship reasons) was the first New Zealand Open to be staged as an open tournament (allowing amateurs and professionals to play together). It was a joint men's and women's event.

Finals

Men's singles

 Tony Roche defeated  Rod Laver 6–1, 6–4, 4–6, 6–3.

Women's singles
 Ann Jones defeated  Karen Krantzcke 6–1, 6–1

References

External links 
 ATP – tournament profile

Heineken Open
ATP Auckland Open
New Zealand Open
January 1969 sports events in New Zealand
February 1969 sports events in New Zealand